Sergi Bruguera defeated Boris Becker in the final, 5–7, 6–4, 7–6(8–6), 7–6(7–4) to win the singles tennis title at the 1991 Monte Carlo Open.

Andrei Chesnokov was the defending champion, but lost to Boris Becker in the quarterfinals.

Seeds
The top eight seeds received a bye to the second round.

Draw

Finals

Top half

Section 1

Section 2

Bottom half

Section 3

Section 4

External links
 1991 Monte Carlo Open draw

Singles